Gotoma the Buddha is a 1956 Indian documentary film directed by Rajbans Khanna. It was entered into the 1957 Cannes Film Festival, where it won a Special Mention for Best Director and competed for the Palme d'Or (Best Film).

See also
Depictions of Gautama Buddha in film

References

External links

1956 films
1956 documentary films
Indian documentary films
Films about Gautama Buddha
Documentary films about Buddhism
Documentary films about Gautama Buddha
Indian black-and-white films